The women's 400m freestyle S13 event at the 2008 Summer Paralympics took place at the Beijing National Aquatics Center on 8 September. There were two heats; the swimmers with the eight fastest times advanced to the final. The final produced a dead heat for third place and two bronze medals were awarded. The silver medal was won by Anna Efimenko of Russia, a more impaired S12 competitor. The gold medal was won by Valerie Grand Maison who set a world-record of 4:28.64 in the final.

Results

Heats
Competed from 09:47.

Heat 1

Heat 2

Final
Competed at 17:45.

 
Q = qualified for final. WR = World Record. PR = Paralympic Record.

References
 
 

Swimming at the 2008 Summer Paralympics
2008 in women's swimming